Vandamattom is a village in  Kodikulam Panchayath, Thodupuzha Taluk, Idukki district, Kerala,  India.

Location
Vandamattom is situated in the bank of a small river (Thodu) which runs from Chilavumala to Kaliyar River, in Kodikulam Grama Panchayath, Thodupuzha taluk, Idukki district, Kerala, India.

References

External links
 [http://www.indiastudychannel.com/india/cities/39298-Vandamattom.aspx Vandamottam on IndiaStudyChannel.com

Villages in Idukki district